Greece and Kazakhstan established diplomatic relations on 1 October 1992. Greece opened an embassy in Almaty in February 1997. Kazakhstan opened an embassy in Athens in 2005. Kazakhstan has had an honorary consulate in Athens since 1998.

Kazakhstan has a Greek community of 10,000 to 12,000 people. The Greek community is a valued ethnic group in Kazakhstan's multi-ethnic society. Kazakhstan's diplomats regularly brief Greek officials of the Greek community in Kazakhstan.

Along with communities based in nearby Kyrgyzstan, the expatriate Greeks are served by a  "Friendship federation", which publishes a small newspaper and organises social events.

Political Cooperation
The two countries have a Kazakhstan - Greece Parliamentary Friendship Group.

Economic Co-operation
In addition to a general desire to improve ties and develop trade with the EU,
Kazakhstan has particular interest in the Burgas–Alexandroupoli pipeline which will allow the transport of its oil from the Black Sea port of Burgas to the Greek Aegean port of Alexandroupoli, thus providing access to the markets of Southern and Western Europe while bypassing the Bosporus and the Dardanelles.

Former Greece president Konstantinos Stephanopoulos has expressed admiration for Kazakhstan and interest in further developing trade.

List of bilateral visits
 The Kazakh President Nursultan Nazarbayev visited Greece in July 2001
 The President of Greece Konstantinos Stephanopoulos visited Kazakhstan in June 2002.
The Kazakh leader Nursultan Nazarbayev also attended the 2004 Summer Olympics opening ceremony.

Bilateral agreements
The Greek parliament ratified in 2017 the European Union's Enhanced Partnership and Cooperation Agreement with Kazakhstan opening wider the door for enhanced trade, FDI and political collaboration between Greece and Kazakhstan.

 Economic and Technological Cooperation Agreement
 Agreement on the Promotion and Protection of Investments.
 The first meeting of the Greek-Kazakh Joint Interministerial Committee was held in July 2006 and a relevant Protocol was signed between the two countries.

Ambassadors of Greece to Kazakhstan  
 (the embassy opened in February 1997)
 Kontantin Tritaris 09/29/1997 - 05/17/2000 (Almaty)
 Nikolaos Khatupis 07/06/2000 - 22/01/2005 (Almaty)
 Christ Kontovunisios 02/19/2005 - 09/12/2008 (Almaty)
 Evangelos Denaksas 11/12/2008 - 31/03/2011 (Almaty - Astana)
 Efthymios Pandzopoulos 12/28/2011 - 07/10/2016
 Alexandros Katranis 07/13/2016 - 8/31/2019 (Astana)
 Adam-Georgios Adamidis 9/22/2019 - today (Nur-Sultan)

See also
Foreign relations of Greece
Foreign relations of Kazakhstan
Greeks in Kazakhstan
Kazakhstan–EU relations

References

External links 
Greek Ministry of Foreign Affairs about the relation with Kazakhstan

 
Kazakhstan
Greece